The Waccamaw River Heritage Preserve is a ,  stretch of protected wetland that follows the Waccamaw River in northeastern Horry County, South Carolina.

Description 
The Waccamaw River Heritage Preserve spans from the South Carolina state border to the north to a public boat ramp at Red Bluff, to the south. Roughly encompassing the Waccamaw River on either side, the preserve's property consists of small, partially connected parcels of land that are legally protected by the state.

External links 
 Department of Natural Resources Page for the Reserve
 Map of the Reserve

Nature reserves in South Carolina
Protected areas of Horry County, South Carolina